Choi Bok-ran (born 15 December 1960) is a South Korean fencer. She competed in the women's individual foil event at the 1984 Summer Olympics.

References

1960 births
Living people
South Korean female fencers
Olympic fencers of South Korea
Fencers at the 1984 Summer Olympics